George Gordon Hyde,  (January 24, 1883 – July 20, 1946) was a Canadian politician, and a prominent lawyer in the city of Montreal.

Born in Montreal, Quebec on January 24, 1883, he was educated at the High School of Montreal and McGill University, where he obtained a law degree, and was called to the Quebec Bar on 21 August 1908. He became well known in the fields of company and commercial law, first with the law firm of R.C. Smith, K.C., and later as senior partner of his own firm, Hyde & Ahern. He was made King's Counsel 27 December 1918, and elected president of the Junior Bar Association of Montreal 1919. Elected Quebec Vice-President of the Canadian Bar Association in 1944. President of the Reform Club of Montreal, 1935. He was well known in English and American legal circles.

In 1939 he ran as Liberal candidate in the provincial riding of Westmount–Saint-Georges, and was elected as Member of the Legislative Assembly (Now known as the National Assembly of Quebec). In 1942, he was appointed as a Member of the Legislative Council of Quebec.

He was married to Lilian Boronow, and was the father of John Richard Hyde, also a Montreal lawyer (with the firm of Hyde & Ahern), who represented the provincial riding of Westmount–Saint-Georges from 1954 through 1970. Another son, Flight Lieutenant George G. (Kewp) Hyde, RCAF, was killed on active service in England during the Second World War. He also had a daughter, Shirley Anne Hyde (married Robert Tremaine).

George Gordon Hyde died in Montreal on July 20, 1946, at the age of 62.

External links 

Montreal Gazette. Obituary published July 22, 1946.
Montreal Daily Star, Obituary published July 22, 1946;

1883 births
1946 deaths
Anglophone Quebec people
Canadian King's Counsel
High School of Montreal alumni
Lawyers from Montreal
McGill University Faculty of Law alumni
Politicians from Montreal
Quebec Liberal Party MLCs
Quebec Liberal Party MNAs